Chad participated in every edition of the African Games since the competition was established in 1965 and has a total of eleven medals as of the 2019 games.

Medal Record

References